Acacia julifera is a tree belonging to the genus Acacia and the subgenus Juliflorae that is native to north eastern Australia.

It has reddish, greyish-brown or black coloured bark that is tough and fibrous. The slender and slightly flattened branchlets are a reddish or purplish-brown colour and become glabrous with age. Like most species of Acacia it has phyllodes rather than true leaves. It blooms between March and August producing golden flowers.

It is endemic to south eastern parts of the Gulf of Carpentaria where it is found in coastal and sub-coastal districts.

See also
List of Acacia species

References

julifera
Flora of Queensland
Taxa named by George Bentham
Plants described in 1842